Southern Survival is a 2020 reality television show streaming television series. The premise revolves around the BattlBox crew who test outdoor and survival gear with extreme methods.

Episodes

Release 
Southern Survival was released on July 3, 2020, on Netflix.

References

External links
 
 

2020 American television series debuts
English-language Netflix original programming